Dombai-Ulgen or Dombay-Ulgen is a  mountain of the Greater Caucasus and the highest point of Abkhazia, a state with limited international recognition otherwise seen to be part of Georgia. It is located on the border with Karachay–Cherkessia, an autonomous republic of Russia.
The mountain is composed of gneiss, crystalline schist, and granite. The top is covered by snow and glaciers at all times of the year.

Photo Gallery

See also
Geography of Abkhazia
Geography of Georgia (country)
Geography of Russia
List of countries by highest point (Countries with disputed sovereignty)

References

Dombai-Ulgen
Dombai-Ulgen
Dombai-Ulgen
International mountains of Europe
Georgia (country)–Russia border
Four-thousanders of the Caucasus